The Swedish Mixed Doubles Curling Championship is the national championship of mixed doubles curling (one man and one woman) in Sweden. It has been held annually since season 2007-2008 (??).

List of champions and medallists
Team line-ups shows in order: man, woman, coach (if exists).

Medal record for curlers
As of 2022 Swedish Mixed Doubles Curling Championship

References

See also
Swedish Men's Curling Championship
Swedish Women's Curling Championship
Swedish Mixed Curling Championship
Swedish Junior Curling Championships
Swedish Senior Curling Championships

Curling competitions in Sweden
Recurring sporting events established in 2008
2008 establishments in Sweden
National curling championships
Swedish